Yajurvedi is an Indian surname used by Yajurvedi Brahmins, meaning versed in Yajurveda. It is one of the two major sub-sects among Deshastha Brahmins. Similarly there are Rigvedi (one who knows Rigveda).

See also
Rigvedi
Dwivedi
Trivedi
Upreti
Chaturvedi

References

Indian names